Martin Stefanov (born 25 April 1987) is a Bulgarian footballer, who currently plays as a forward for Sportist Svoge.

References

External links 
 

1987 births
Living people
Bulgarian footballers
First Professional Football League (Bulgaria) players
Second Professional Football League (Bulgaria) players
PFC Slavia Sofia players
FC Sportist Svoge players
PFC Nesebar players
FC Spartak Plovdiv players
Botev Plovdiv players
Association football forwards
People from Vidin